Tidewater Oil Company (rendered as "Tide Water Oil Company" from 1887 to 1936) was a major petroleum refining company during the early 20th century.  Tidewater was sold many times during its existence. Brands included Tydol, Flying A, and Veedol.

The Veedol brand was owned by British Petroleum until 2011, when Veedol was sold by BP to Tidewater India. Now it is part of Andrew Yule Indian group and manufactures automotive oil for the Indian market. Tidewater does not have its own refinery, so it is dependent on base oil suppliers like HPCL and BPCL, It manufactures a wide range of automotive lubricants.

History 

Tide Water was founded in New York City in 1887. The company entered the gasoline market and by 1920 was selling gasoline, oil and other products on the East Coast of the United States under its "Tydol" brand. 

In 1926, control of Tide Water Oil sold out to a new holding company, Tide Water Associated Oil Company, which also acquired a controlling interest in California’s Associated Oil Company. Soon thereafter, Standard Oil Company of New Jersey took control of the company. Flying A became the primary brand name for the company, though the Tydol and Associated names were also retained in their respective marketing areas.

Tidewater Oil Company operated a fleet of oil tankers. During World War II, it chartered ships to the Maritime Commission and War Shipping Administration and operated T2 tankers to support the war effort. Ships included: USS Guyandot (AOG-16), SS Byron D. Benson, SS Samuel Q. Brown, Falls of Clyde, and others.

During the 1950s, the Associated and Tydol brands gradually fell into disuse, and were dropped entirely in 1956. 

In 1966, Phillips Petroleum Company (now ConocoPhillips) purchased Tidewater's western refining, distribution and retailing network. Phillips immediately rebranded all Flying A stations in the region to Phillips 66. On the East Coast that year, American-born British petrol-industrialist J. Paul Getty merged his numerous oil interests into Getty Oil Company, and Tidewater Oil was dropped as a corporate brand.

In 2000, BP acquired the Veedol brand when it bought Burmah-Castrol. In February 2011, BP offered to sell the Veedol brand, which was purchased that October by Tide Water India, part of the Andrew Yule group Indian company.

See also

Bayonne refinery strikes of 1915–1916

References

External links

 Tide Water Oil Co. of India

Defunct oil companies of the United States
Texaco
Articles containing video clips